Darzab is a town and the center of the Darzab District, Jowzjan Province, Afghanistan.

See also 
 Darzab District
 Jowzjan Province

References

Populated places in Jowzjan Province